Violant de Prades de Gandia (1395–1471), was a Spanish noblewoman.

She was born to the noble Jaume de Prades and Violant de Gandia, and married viscount Bernat Joan, viscount de Cabrera and count de Mòdica. She often managed the fief during the absence of her spouse. In 1461, her spouse participated i the capture of Charles, Prince of Viana, but in the Catalan Civil War, he sided with the rebels against John II of Aragon and Navarre. Violant, however, sided with John II, for which she has in history traditionally been given a bad name. When her spouse was captured by the king, she was able to act as a mediator and eventually facilitate his release. She also fought for the property of her spouse not being confiscated, though she failed in this regard.

References
 «Diccionari Biogràfic de Dones: Violant de Prades de Gandia»
 Grau Pujol, Josep M. T. (1996). Catàleg del fons notarial del districte de Santa Coloma de Farners. Barcelona-Lleida: Fundació Noguera-Pagès.

1395 births
1471 deaths
15th-century Aragonese nobility
15th-century Spanish women